Speocera irritans is a species of spider of the family Ochyroceratidae. It is endemic to the Brazilian state of Amazonas.

See also
 List of Ochyroceratidae species

References

Ochyroceratidae
Spiders of Brazil
Endemic fauna of Brazil
Spiders described in 1978